Mysliveček (feminine Myslivečková), (diminutive form of "") is a Czech surname:

 Jaroslav Mysliveček, Czech rower
 Josef Mysliveček (1737–1781), Czech composer
 53159 Mysliveček
 Lucie Myslivečková, Czech-Slovak figure skater
 Zdeněk Mysliveček (1881–1974), Czech psychiatrist
  (born 1950), Czech guitarist

See also 
 Myśliwiec (disambiguation)

Czech-language surnames